Rick J. Clements is a screen and television writer, the voice of Frank Nougat from Murder Mysteries with Frank Nougat, and the former American professional wrestler known as Quicksilver based out of California. In wrestling, he was part of the independent circuit, working for promotions such as Pro Wrestling Guerrilla and SoCal Uncensored. He also worked for East Coast promotions such as Jersey All Pro Wrestling and Combat Zone Wrestling. He is also known for appearances on MTV's Wrestling Society X under the ring name El Hombre Blanco Enmascarado.

Professional wrestling career

Early career (2002-2005) 
Beginning his career in Revolution Pro, Quicksilver was a graduate of its Rudos Dojo wrestling school along with Chris Bosh, Scorpio Sky, and many others. After debuting in the Fight For The Revolution Tournament in which the winner would receive a contract with the company, Quicksilver would advance all the way to the finals against Scorpio Sky ending in a time limit draw. Both men were given contracts.

Quicksilver and Scorpio Sky would then form the team of the "Aerial Xpress", or AXP for short. They had great success quickly running through all the top tag teams and becoming Southern California Tag Team of the Year in both 2003 and 2004. The Aerial Xpress won the AWS tag team titles 2 times. In late 2004 Quicksilver would win the finals of the Spirit of the Revolution Tournament defeating Phoenix Star in the finals. He would then go on to compete in the 2004 Revolution J tournament losing to partner Scorpio Sky in the finals. Soon after he defeated Scorpio Sky to become the Revolution Pro Junior Heavyweight Champion on the final Rev Pro show.

In 2005 he would also hold the AWS Light Heavyweight Title at the same time and would lose and regain The Revolution Pro Junior title becoming the last man to ever hold the championship.

Pro Wrestling Guerrilla (2004-2007) 
After arriving in Pro Wrestling Guerrilla, Quicksilver and tag team partner Scorpio Sky, known as the Aerial Xpress, were successful but when Scorpio Sky was sidelined due to injury, Quicksilver found himself teaming up with Chris Bosh, Quicksilver won the PWG Tag Team titles with Chris but lost them soon after.

Quicksilver then teamed back up with Scorpio Sky with Dino Winwood as their manager to chase the PWG tag titles in 2004 and 2005. They received shots at then champions Arrogance (Scott Lost and Chris Bosh) but were unsuccessful. In the summer of 2005 they defeated Los Luchas (Zokre & Phoenix Star) to become #1 Contenders and once again were given a shot at the belts in a Masks vs. Titles match, If the Aerial Xpress lost they would be forced to remove their masks. This time they were victorious.

The Aerial Xpress had finally won the PWG World Tag Team Championships, but their victory came at a price. During the match, Quicksilver was injured on a dive to the outside of the ring. Because of this, Sky had to wrestle most of the match alone. Despite the fact that the Aerial Xpress won, Chris Bosh, Scott Lost and Joey Ryan still unmasked Scorpio Sky. After this event Scorpio disappeared from PWG for several months, which forced the AXP to relinquish the tag team titles. With Sky gone Quicksilver changed his focus to singles competition; more specifically, the PWG World Championship In August 2005 he faced Kevin Steen for the championship but was unsuccessful. In September, Quicksilver competed in the first Battle of Los Angeles tournament, defeating Davey Richards and Rocky Romero before being defeated by Chris Bosh (who went on to win the tournament).

In 2006 Quicksilver teamed with fellow masked wrestler El Generico to create the team known as "Cape Fear". In January they received a tag team title shot, facing Super Dragon and Davey Richards in the main event of "Crusin' for a Brusin'". The team came very close to winning the match, but could not capture the belts on this occasion. Cape Fear received a rematch in February, once again main eventing, this time at the "European Vacation - Germany" event. Once again, they were defeated. After receiving two title shots in the span of two months Cape Fear had to work their way back into title contention. Over the next few months they would face Arrogance (twice) and Los Luchas before getting a third shot at Super Dragon and Davey Richards at "All Star Weekend 3 - Night 2" in April, but they were defeated for a third time. Cape Fear would continue to team together facing teams such as The Briscoe Brothers, Alex Koslov and Ronin, Chris Sabin and Kevin Steen, The Kings of Wrestling (Chris Hero and Claudio Castagnoli), and The Motor City Machine Guns.  In September Quicksilver once again competed in the Battle of Los Angeles, but was eliminated in the first round by Dragon Kid. In November Quicksilver would face Joey Ryan in a PWG World Championship match, but would lose. He would end the year on a high note, finally winning the tag team titles when he and El Generico defeated Super Dragon and B-Boy at "Passive Hostility" in December.

After three title defenses, Cape Fear's title reign came to an end. Quicksilver suffered a class two concussion during a match with El Generico against Davey Richards and Roderick Strong at "Guitarmageddon II: Armoryageddon" on February 10, 2007. At "Album of the Year" on March 10, 2007 the titles would be vacated.

Wrestling Society X (2006) 
In 2006, Quicksilver arrived in Wrestling Society X as "El Hombre Blanco Enmascarado". His debut on WSX against Jack Evans ended in defeat.  He was a mainstay on WSX-tra where he formed a tag team with old school wrestler Matt Classic.

Retirement (2007-present) 
Quicksilver wrestled his final match in February 2007. In 2015, Quicksilver revealed in a podcast interview he had retired due to contracting MRSA, a form of a staph infection in the match with Richards and Strong. He said the infection became so bad he nearly died and took it as a sign to move on.

Championships and accomplishments 
Alternative Wrestling Show
AWS Light Heavyweight Championship (1 time)
AWS Tag Team Championship (2 times) - with Scorpio Sky

Pro Wrestling Guerrilla
PWG World Tag Team Championship (3 times) – with Scorpio Sky (1), Chris Bosh (1) and El Generico (1)

Pro Wrestling Illustrated
PWI ranked him #373 of the 500 best singles wrestlers of the PWI Years in 2006

Revolution Pro Wrestling
Revolution Pro Junior Heavyweight Championship (2 times)
Spirit of The Revolution Tournament (2004)

SoCal Uncensored
Match of the Year (2005) with Scorpio Sky vs. Chris Bosh and Scott Lost, July 9, 2005, The 2nd Annual PWG Bicentennial Birthday Extravaganza - Night One
Rookie of the Year (2003)
Tag Team of the Year (2003, 2004) with Scorpio Sky
Tag Team of the Year (2006) with El Generico

Luchas de Apuestas record

References

External links 
 
 

21st-century professional wrestlers
American male professional wrestlers
Living people
Masked wrestlers
Professional wrestlers from California
PWG World Tag Team Champions
Year of birth missing (living people)